Craspedisia is a genus of comb-footed spiders that was first described by Eugène Louis Simon in 1894.  it contains three species, found in China, the Dominican Republic, and Brazil: C. cornuta, C. longioembolia, and C. spatulata.

See also
 List of Theridiidae species

References

Araneomorphae genera
Spiders of China
Spiders of South America
Spiders of the Caribbean
Theridiidae